The Federation of European Nutrition Societies (FENS) is a non-profit association, established in 1979 as an umbrella organization for the national nutrition societies of Europe. Each member country is represented by its representative Nutrition Society or Association within FENS.

The aims of FENS are the combination of efforts for the development of research and education in Nutrition Sciences and the promotion of the importance of Nutrition for public health in Europe. It seeks to do this by coordinating the European nutrition societies at a European level, promoting and disseminating research and knowledge on nutrition sciences and facilitating nutrition learning and training, as well as scientific exchange across Europe.

Activities
FENS conducts every 4 years its main event, the FENS European Nutrition Conference, which is organized by one of the FENS member societies, elected by the FENS General Assembly. All FENS Member Societies and Associations can take part in the bidding process for the organization of a FENS ENC.

The Federation of European Nutrition Societies is a member of the International Union of Nutritional Sciences (IUNS) and holds Affiliated Body status. The official FENS Journal is the “Annals of Nutrition and Metabolism” (IF 2020/2021: 3.374)

FENS Members (status 2015)

European Nutrition Conferences

References

External links
Official Website
Glutathione Benefits
Prebiotics For Athletes

European medical and health organizations
International medical associations of Europe
Non-profit organizations based in Europe
Nutrition organizations
Nut